Keith Williams (born September 16, 1957) is an American comic book and comic strip artist. He is best known for illustrating The Phantom for over a decade together with George Olesen. He also worked on Superman with John Byrne.

Since Paul Ryan took over the Phantom strip, Williams has mainly worked in comic books, like Kolchak: The Night Stalker, Buckaroo Banzai and Domino Lady from Moonstone Books.

References

1957 births
Living people
American comics artists